"Hon har blommor i sitt hår" is a song by Swedish singer-songwriter Anders Glenmark from his sixth studio album, Jag finns här för dig (1990). The song was written by Glenmark and Leif Käck, and produced by Glenmark.

Track listing and formats 

 Swedish 7-inch single

A. "Hon har blommor i sitt hår" – 3:05
B. "Hon har blommor i sitt hår – andra sidan" – 3:33

Credits and personnel 

 Anders Glenmark – songwriter, producer, vocals
 Leif Käck – songwriter
 Lennart Östlund – engineering
 Peter Dahl – mastering

Credits and personnel adopted from the Jag finns här för dig album and 7-inch single liner notes.

Charts

Weekly charts

Certifications

References

External links 

 

1990 songs
1990 singles
Anders Glenmark songs
Polar Music singles
Songs written by Anders Glenmark
Swedish-language songs